General Erskine may refer to:

George Elphinstone Erskine (1841-1912), British Indian Army major general
George Erskine (1899–1965), British Army general
Graves B. Erskine (1897–1973), U.S. Marine Corps general
Ian Erskine (1898–1973), British Army major general
John Erskine, Earl of Mar (1675–1732), Scottish Jacobite general
Sir William Erskine, 1st Baronet (1728–1795), British Army lieutenant general
Sir William Erskine, 2nd Baronet (1770–1813), British Army major general

See also
Vernon Erskine-Crum (1918–1971), British Army lieutenant general